NA-9 (Malakand) is a constituency for the National Assembly of Pakistan. It covers the whole of district Malakand. The constituency was formerly known as NA-35 (Malakand) from 1977 to 2018. The name changed to NA-8 (Malakand) after the delimitation in 2018 and NA-9 (Malakand) after the 2022 Delimitation.

Members of Parliament

1977–2002: NA-35 (Islamabad Capital Area)

2002–2018: NA-35 (Malakand Protected Area)

2018-2022: NA-8 (Malakand Protected Area)

Elections since 2002

2002 general election

A total of 1,915 votes were rejected.

2008 general election

A total of 2,380 votes were rejected.

2013 general election

A total of 4,362 votes were rejected.

2018 general election 

General elections were held on 25 July 2018.

Contest overview
Chairman of Pakistan Peoples Party, Bilawal Bhutto Zardari contested from this constituency and lost the election. Junaid Akbar of Pakistan Tehreek-e-Insaf was elected from this constituency in 2013 and retained the seat.

Results

†JI and JUI-F contested as part of MMA

By-election 2023 
A by-election will be held on 19 March 2023 due to the resignation of Junaid Akbar, the previous MNA from this seat.

See also
NA-8 (Bajaur)
NA-10 (Buner)

References

External links 
Election result's official website

8
8